Renato Valentini (24 October 1946 – 2 June 2016) was an Italian alpine skier who competed in the 1968 Winter Olympics.

References
sports-reference.com
Renato Valentin's obituary 

1946 births
2016 deaths
Italian male alpine skiers
Olympic alpine skiers of Italy
Alpine skiers at the 1968 Winter Olympics